From Hare to Heir is a 1960 Warner Bros. Merrie Melodies theatrical cartoon short directed and written by Friz Freleng. The short was released on September 3, 1960, and stars Bugs Bunny and Yosemite Sam.

Plot
In Bedlam Manor, Sam, Duke of Yosemite, learns he is penniless from one of his servants, because his uncle, the King, has cut off his allowance. After Sam punishes the servant for this message, Bugs Bunny comes to his door and offers Sam £1 million (equivalent to about £24 million in 2022). According to the document that Bugs reads, Sam must prove that he is worthy of the monetary gift by displaying mild temperament at all times; if he loses his temper at any time, a portion of the £1 million will be deducted, the amount depending on what Bugs thinks is suitable ("In short, whenever you blow your top, you blow some dough. Get it?"). Sam welcomes Bugs into his home, anxious to receive the £1 million.

Bugs plays the role of an annoying house guest to test Sam's temperament. During dinner, Bugs keeps asking Sam for various condiments one by one (first asking for salt -with Sam very nearly losing money after he rudely tells Bugs to get it himself- then asking for pepper, and finally asking for olives). Sam takes it in stride at first, but it becomes too much, so he goes into a closet to express his vexation. It does not help, though, as Bugs can hear him through the door so Sam loses £300 which is changed to £400 after another burst of anger, prompting Sam to run outside into the distance to let off more steam.

Bugs' provoking of Sam continues that night by playing the piano while loudly and obnoxiously singing Jeanie with the Light Brown Hair while Sam is trying to sleep. Sam bursts out of his room and screams: "Stop that music, ya crazy rackin', frackin', varmint rabbit!". After Bugs deducts some more money, Sam requests that he play "Brahms' Lullaby" so that he can fall asleep. Bugs agrees, but instead he becomes the form of a one-man marching band pacing back and forth right outside Sam's bedroom door. Of course, this ticks off Sam even more, but he is able to pretend that he likes it.

Next morning, Bugs hogs the bathroom and Sam shouts for him to get out, the first demand resulting in Bugs slamming the door into him (without being penalized strangely) and the second costing him another £400 plus 35 shillings. After furiously pounding his head on the piano (with Bugs thinking the noise is a "song") and realizing he is not going to have any money left if the temper-losing deductions keep up, Sam gets an idea to get rid of Bugs and make it look like an accident so that he receives the entire million. He saws a hole in the floor outside the bathroom door and covers the hole with a mat so that when Bugs comes out of the bathroom and walks over it, he will go through and plunge into the river below. When Bugs still will not budge from the bathroom, Sam bursts in and pushes him out, but Bugs traverses across the covered hole and Sam falls through it, cursing in gibberish all the way down. A drenched Sam charges back upstairs and is told by Bugs that he can use the bathroom now. Sam charges towards Bugs but has completely forgotten about the hole between them, falling through and plunging into the river again, bellowing out the same cursive gibberish as before.

Later that day, Bugs climbs up a long staircase. Sam is awaiting for him at the top, posing as a statue in armor. When Bugs gets close enough, Sam takes a swing at his head with an ax, but Bugs ducks and he falls down the stairs. As Sam descends while cursing in gibberish all the way down, Bugs continuously writes out deductions.

The next day, Sam -having acknowledged Bugs as the real master of the house- finally gets control of his temper. He shows Bugs by having his servants (his butler, his accountant from earlier and his cook) physically mock him with a pie in the face, a kick in the rear and a conk over the head with a rolling pin (effectively punishing himself for his actions). As Sam goes through this repeatedly, Bugs asides to the audience: “I haven’t got the heart to tell him that he’s used up all the money” as the cartoon fades to black.

Usage in compilations
This cartoon was included in the 1983 compilation film Daffy Duck's Movie: Fantastic Island as Sam's wish.

Home media
From Hare to Heir is available, uncensored and uncut, on the Looney Tunes Super Stars DVD. However, it was cropped to widescreen.

In 2020, the cartoon was remastered and restored to full screen in the Bugs Bunny 80th Anniversary Collection Blu-Ray.

See also
 List of American films of 1960
 List of Bugs Bunny cartoons
 List of Yosemite Sam cartoons

References

External links

1960 films
1960 animated films
1960 short films
Merrie Melodies short films
Short films directed by Friz Freleng
Films scored by Milt Franklyn
Animated films about rabbits and hares
Bugs Bunny films
Films set in country houses
Films set in the 18th century
Films set in England
1960s Warner Bros. animated short films
Yosemite Sam films
1960s English-language films
Films about nobility